Abdul Rauf Rind is a Pakistani politician who has been a member of the Provincial Assembly of the Balochistan since August 2018.

Education
He hold a degree of Bachelor of Business Administration.

Political career
He began his political career in 2005. He was elected as nazim of Kech District in October 2005. He remained in the office until 2009.

He was elected to the Provincial Assembly of the Balochistan as a candidate of Balochistan Awami Party (BAP) from Constituency PB-47 (Kech-III) in 2018 Pakistani general election. He received 11,942 votes and defeated Jamil Ahmed Dashti, a candidate of Balochistan National Party.

On 8 September 2018, he was inducted into the provincial Balochistan cabinet of Chief Minister Jam Kamal Khan. On 9 September, he was appointed as advisor to Chief Minister on fisheries.

References

Living people
Balochistan Awami Party MPAs (Balochistan)
Politicians from Balochistan, Pakistan
Year of birth missing (living people)